The University of Maine at Farmington (UMaine Farmington or UMF) is a public liberal arts college in Farmington, Maine.  It is part of the University of Maine System and a founding member of the Council of Public Liberal Arts Colleges.

History
In March 1863, a Normal School Act passed into law, and that fall, Farmington was chosen from a list of possible locations for a normal school. Founded in 1864 as the state's first publicly funded normal school, the first class graduated from the Western State Normal School in 1866. The school merged into the University of Maine System in 1968 to become the University of Maine at Farmington.

Many early graduates attended the school for its liberal arts offerings alone. Among these were the Stanley brothers, famous for building the Stanley Steamer automobile, and John Frank Stevens, engineer of the Panama Canal. Comedian Bob Marley graduated with a degree in community health.

Interest in the liberal arts continued unabated, and the college offered its first degree programs in the liberal arts in 1971. By the 1974–75 school year, nearly 300 students were enrolled in liberal arts majors.

In early 2016, the University of Maine at Farmington Education Center was named in honor of its longtime President Theodora J. Kalikow who served from 1994 to 2012. Now named the Theodora J. Kalikow Education Center, the LEED-Silver certified building is home to the UMF College of Education, Health and Rehabilitation. The 44,500 square foot building features a geothermal heating and cooling system as well as recycled and sustainable construction materials.

Athletics
The UMaine Farmington Beavers compete in the NCAA Division III North Atlantic Conference. The school's official colors are maroon and white.

UMaine Farmington has 12 NCAA varsity teams, including men's teams in baseball, basketball, cross country, golf, and soccer; and women's teams in basketball, cross country, field hockey, soccer, softball, and lacrosse. Athletics sponsors varsity men's and women's programs in alpine and Nordic skiing and snowboarding that compete through the United States Collegiate Ski & Snowboard Association (USCSA). There are also club teams in cheerleading, ice hockey, men's rugby, women's rugby, and men's and women's ultimate disc sport. Recent NAC champions include men's cross country (2003–2005), women's basketball (2004, 2006, 2007), women's cross country (2004–2005), women's field hockey (2003–2004, 2006, 2007), women's soccer (2003), women's softball (2005) and men's basketball (2010). Recent NCAA tournament appearances include women's basketball (2006), women's field hockey (2004, 2006, 2007), women's soccer (2003) and women's softball (2005). In 2010 the men's basketball team advanced to the second round of the NCAA Division III National Tournament.

In addition to the outdoor athletic fields and Dearborn Gymnasium, UMF has a Fitness and Recreation Center that houses a cardio fitness area with machines, a fully equipped and supervised weight room with free weights and weight machines, four multipurpose courts, a 1/8-mile walking/jogging track, and a 25-yard swimming pool for the use of UMF students and members of the area community.

Notable alumni
 Sharon H. Abrams, executive director, Maine Children's Home for Little Wanderers
 Steve Clifford, professional basketball head coach
 Lance Harvell, state legislator
 Otis Wells Johnson, Wisconsin state legislator
 Bob Marley, comedian
 David Miramant, Maine state legislator
 Francis Edgar Stanley, inventor of the Stanley Steamer
 Freelan Oscar Stanley, inventor of the Stanley Steamer and builder of the Stanley Hotel
 John Frank Stevens, designer of the Panama Canal
 Charlotte Warren, Maine state legislator and former mayor of Hallowell, Maine
 Alexander Willette, Maine state legislator
 Chandler Woodcock, politician

References

External links
Official website

 
Educational institutions established in 1864
Farmington, Maine
Universities and colleges in Franklin County, Maine
University of Maine Farmington
1864 establishments in Maine
University of Maine at Farmington
Public liberal arts colleges in the United States